Ali Nowdeh (also Romanized as ‘Alī Nowdeh and ‘Alī Now Deh) is a village in Belesbeneh Rural District, Kuchesfahan District, Rasht County, Gilan Province, Iran. At the 2006 census, its population was 524, in 155 families.

References 

Populated places in Rasht County